Khariar Road is a city in India. It is located at Odisha-Chhattisgarh border. It is also one of the key railway stations of the East Coast Railway.

Topography
Khariar Road is on a vast plain land with very slight variations in land level. It has one river named Jonk, which a tributary of Mahanadi. Most of the town gets its water supply from this river. Khariar Road is surrounded by some small mountains, part of the Eastern Ghats. The land here has medium range fertility and most of the farmers here prefer to grow rice. Overall, it has a good topography, but in the summer, it faces water scarcity as the river level decreases.

Economic condition
In the last 15 to 20 years, Khariar Road has grown to become one of the most growing economic and business hubs in Nuapada. As it is near the border of Chhattisgarh and is also just  from Nuapada, it has an easy access and transport facility for trading. Most of the businessmen buy their supplies from Mahasamund and Raipur and sell in the market. Most of the people from Nuapada and nearby villages come here and buy their supplies. After the development of its railway station, its economy has grown.

Demographics
According to the 2011 Census of India,  Khariar Road had a population of 16,629. Males constituted 51% of the population and females 49%. Khariar Road had an average literacy rate of 61%, higher than the national average of 59.5%; male literacy was 70% and female literacy 51%. In Khariar Road, 14% of the population was under 6 years of age.

Schools
Delhi Public School
Navjyoti Vidyalaya 
Gopobandhu High School 
Saraswati Vidya Mandir 
Gurukul ashram
Gurunanak public school 
Gyanjyoti kr vidlaya 
KG Sharaff Public school
Dattatraya High school
GOVT PUPS BANKA

References

Cities and towns in Nuapada district